Mueang Kanchanaburi is the capital district (amphoe mueang) of Kanchanaburi province, central Thailand.

History
Mueang Kanchanaburi changed status to become the capital district (amphoe mueang) of Kanchanaburi Province in 1913. The old district office was in Tambon Ban Nuea. It was moved to Tambon Pak Phraek on 1 October 1954.

The district is home to the "bridge over the River Kwai", part of World War II's Death Railway.

Geography
Neighboring are (from west clockwise) Tanintharyi Division of Myanmar, Sai Yok, Si Sawat, Bo Phloi, Tha Muang, and Dan Makham Tia of Kanchanaburi Province and Suan Phueng of Ratchaburi province.

The Khwae Noi and Khwae Yai Rivers are important water resources which join at the town Kanchanaburi to form the Mae Klong River.

Phu Nam Ron is a transnational cross-border point at the western end of the district. It is expected to gain in importance if the planned Dawei deepwater port project goes ahead, along with a highway and a railway line between Bangkok and that harbor.

Administration
The district is divided into 13 sub-districts (tambons), which are further subdivided into 99 villages (mubans). The town (thesaban mueang) Kanchanaburi covers tambons Ban Nuea, Ban Tai, and parts of Pak Phraek, Tha Makham, and also parts of tambon Tha Lo of neighboring Tha Muang district. Additionally there are three townships (thesaban tambons): Kaeng Sian, Nong Bua, and Talat Ya each covering parts of the same-named tambons, and 11 tambon administrative organizations (TAO).

Missing numbers belong to tambon which now form Dan Makham Tia

References

External links
amphoe.com

Kanchanaburi
Mueang Kanchanaburi